Dictablanda is a dictatorship in which civil liberties are allegedly preserved rather than destroyed. The word dictablanda is a pun on the Spanish word dictadura ("dictatorship"), replacing dura, which by itself is a word meaning "hard", with blanda, meaning "soft".

The term was first used in Spain in 1930 when Dámaso Berenguer replaced Miguel Primo de Rivera y Orbaneja as the head of the ruling dictatorial government and attempted to reduce tensions in the country by repealing some of the harsher measures that had been introduced by the latter. It was also used to refer to the latter years of Francisco Franco's Spanish State, and to the hegemonic 70-year rule of the Institutional Revolutionary Party (PRI) in Mexico, or by Augusto Pinochet when he was asked about his regime and the accusations about his government.

Analogously, the same pun is made in Portuguese as ditabranda or ditamole. In February 2009, the Brazilian newspaper Folha de S.Paulo ran an editorial classifying the military dictatorship in Brazil (1964–1985) as a "ditabranda", creating controversy.

In Spanish language, the term dictablanda is contrasted with democradura (a portmanteau of 'democracia' and 'dictadura'), meaning an illiberal democracy — a system in which the government and its leaders are elected, but which is relatively deficient in civil liberties.

In Uruguay, the short-lived dictatorship of Alfredo Baldomir in 1942 was nicknamed dictablanda, as opposed to the previous harsh dictatorship by Gabriel Terra.

See also 
 Authoritarian democracy
 Illiberal democracy

References

Authoritarianism
Dictatorship
Spanish words and phrases